The 2012 Fort Lauderdale mayoral election was held on February 13, 2009  to elect the mayor of Fort Lauderdale, Florida. It saw the election of Jack Seiler.

The election was nonpartisan.

Having served six consecutive terms, incumbent mayor Jim Naugle was term-limited.

Results

References 

Fort Lauderdale
Mayoral elections in Fort Lauderdale
Fort Lauderdale